Intelligent vehicle technologies comprise electronic, electromechanical, and electromagnetic devices - usually silicon micromachined components operating in conjunction with computer-controlled devices and radio transceivers to provide precision repeatability functions (such as in robotics artificial intelligence systems) emergency warning validation performance reconstruction.

Applications
Intelligent vehicle technologies commonly apply to car safety systems and self-contained autonomous electromechanical sensors generating warnings that can be transmitted within a specified targeted area of interest, say within 100 meters of the transceiver. In ground applications, intelligent vehicle technologies are utilized for safety and commercial communications between vehicles or between a vehicle and a sensor along the road.

Intelligent vehicle technologies provide instantaneous on the road information to the motorist who wishes to map a route to a specific destination and expects the system to assist in determining the best course of travel.  The information provided by the in-vehicle system updates approximately every minute (depending on the speed of the vehicle) all the transmitter beacon information self-recorded by the vehicle while traveling on the road. That is, all vehicles traveling on the highway update such information to the local mile markers via DSRC telematics. The mile markers in turn communicate with the regional monitoring station and upload data so as to populate statistical bar graph trend of traffic flow progression. The information further made available for access to the date collected by the system established data exchange format through standard Internet protocol IP address communications links.

Usage-based insurance is based on telematics technology.

Total system intelligence
Total system intelligence means accountability of every IVT equipped vehicle traveling on the road.  Vehicles can use gathered information from the road to determine lane specific vehicle usage and scenarios such as lane closures (in-vehicle notification warning), construction zones, emergency situations, etc.

Information transmission and reception
Intelligent vehicle technologies target transmission capable beacons provide for information signal data that are employed infrastructure to vehicle and vehicle to vehicle for exclusive precision remote communications to the specific one vehicle traveling in a given lane on the highway, for example – or a convoy of vehicles in a given travel lane, or multiple vehicles traveling in all affected lanes. All lanes are beacon tagged so as the vehicle travels down the road the ground beacon maintains communication with the vehicle for that particular lane – so it is therefore possible for example, for law enforcement to direct and provide for specific in-vehicle aural and/or visual information to a target vehicle traveling in a given lane (or multiple vehicle in multiple lanes as desired).

Vehicles traveling in the vicinity of an accident scenario, for example, are simultaneously queried by the in-vehicle police intelligent beacon system computer which repeatedly updates and processes all dynamic passing vehicle data received, identifying and classifying all passing vehicles in real-time – for example, an aural visual command instruction is sent to all the in-vehicle emergency warning beacon system computers as a reminder that no rubbernecking, for example, or viewing of the accident is permitted and vehicles are instructed to safely maintain a given speed limit. Ease of managing, operating, and reducing traffic congestion of the transportation system is therefore achieved.

Examples
For example: An official, noting through IVT that a car's registration has expired, could use telematics to direct the car's driver to pull the car over.

A combination of in-vehicle beacon transceivers and RFID transmitters (surface installed such as reflector tags, or embedded onto the road) would detect a vehicle's position, serial number, make, model, color, unit identification, and orientation. Real-time data would be constantly updated, self-recorded, then uploaded by the vehicle to the telematics mile marker by the vehicle’s transceiver to enable intra-vehicle control communications.

References

Vehicle electronics
Vehicle safety technologies